General elections were held in the Turks and Caicos Islands on 29 September 1976. Although the Progressive National Organisation (PNO) received the most votes, the People's Democratic Movement (PDM) emerged as the largest party in the Legislative Council, winning five of the eleven seats. Following the elections, the PDM formed a coalition government with the two independents, with PDM leader James Alexander George Smith McCartney becoming the first Chief Minister of the islands.

Background
The PNO and PDM were both formed shortly before the elections. The PDM had its roots in the Junkanoo Club youth organisation formed in 1976, but was only formed in early 1976. The PNO was formed in the same year by members of the State Council.

Electoral system
The eleven members of the Legislative Council were elected from single-member constituencies.

Campaign
A total of 23 candidates contested the elections, with the new PNO contesting all 11 seats, the PDM running in eight seats. The other four candidates were independents.

Results

References

Elections in the Turks and Caicos Islands
Turks
General
Turks